Bangor railway station may refer to:

Bangor railway station (Northern Ireland), the terminus of the Belfast–Bangor line in Bangor, Co. Down
Bangor railway station (Wales), a station in Bangor, Gwynedd
Bangor station (Michigan), an Amtrak station in Bangor, Michigan
Bangor Union Station (closed 1961), in Maine

See also
Bangour railway station (closed 1921), near Edinburgh